The Bushmaster 2000 is an electro-pneumatic paintball marker produced by Indian Creek Designs, (ICD), a manufacturer based in Idaho.

Technical specification
The Bushmaster is designed with tournament-style speedball in mind, being capable of shooting more than 20 paintballs per second.  The marker uses two regulators to control airflow; a high-pressure regulator normally set at 200-275psi and a low pressure regulator normally set to 75-90psi.  The Bushmaster operates using a ram-actuated poppet valve.  Commonly the Bushmaster 2000 is referred to as a "B2K" or a "B2KX", where the X indicates the year of that particular model.  The most recent 2004 model is referred to as the B2K4.  The marker was recently discontinued and has been replaced by the similar, but improved, Promaster. Unfortunately Indian Creek Designs has recently decided to leave the marker manufacturing market to concentrate on other business and no longer produces either marker.

The Bob Long Defiant is effectively the same design as the Bushmaster 2000 and most parts can be interchanged between the two markers.

Upgrades 
Many upgrades are available for the Bushmaster series markers including valves, boards, frames, triggers, feednecks, bolts, ASAs and regulators.  The stock barrel can also be replaced with an aftermarket barrel.  The 2003 and earlier models use ICD threaded barrels while 2004 and some 2003 models use Autococker barrel threads.  Other than barrels, the only other compatibility difference between different models is that of the wiring harness or board.  Some models use 22-pin wiring (such as the old LCD boards) while the 12-pin is more common.  A 22 pin board can be plugged into a 12 pin harness and will work correctly except for the paintball detection system.

Anti-chop system
An anti-chop eye system known as PDS (Paintball Detection System) is available stock on 2003 and newer models or can be installed by qualified sources.  PDS uses a sender and receiver photocell that detects whether or not a paintball has been loaded into the breech of the marker.  If no ball is present, the marker will not fire.  This feature greatly reduces the chance of chopping a paintball that is only partially fed into the breech.

Operation 
The operation of the Bushmaster 2000 is very similar to that of the Impulse, Intimidator or other poppet-valve based electropneumatic markers.  The marker is classified as open-bolt, meaning the bolt is in the full-back position before the firing sequence.

When the trigger is pulled, an electronic microswitch sends a signal to the marker's electronic board telling it to begin the firing sequence.  The board then actuates the solenoid which is provided with air from the LPR.  When the solenoid valve is actuated, air that normally holds the hammer in the full-back position is re-routed through the ram assembly and now drives the hammer forward at a rapid rate.  The hammer then pins open the valve for a period of 6-16ms (this time is called the dwell).  Since the marker's bolt is linked to the hammer, it travels forward at the same time carrying a paintball forward, passed the detents, into the firing position.  Air travelling upwards through the, now open, valve is routed through the bolt and the paintball is shot out the barrel through a combination of air pressure and kinetic energy imparted from the bolt movement.  Once the dwell time has passed, the solenoid returns the hammer (and thus the bolt) to the full-back position by routing the LPR-sourced air back through the default passage.

External links 
Indian Creek Designs
Indian Creek Designs Owners Group

Paintball markers